The following is a list of Michigan State Historic Sites in Mackinac County, Michigan. Sites marked with a dagger (†) are also listed on the National Register of Historic Places in Mackinac County, Michigan. Those with a double dagger (‡) are also designated National Historic Landmarks.


Current listings

See also
 National Register of Historic Places listings in Mackinac County, Michigan

Sources
 Historic Sites Online – Mackinac County. Michigan State Housing Developmental Authority. Accessed May 12, 2011.

References

Mackinac County
State Historic Sites
Tourist attractions in Mackinac County, Michigan